The Pollard script, also known as Pollard Miao or Miao, is an abugida loosely based on the Latin alphabet and invented by Methodist missionary Sam Pollard. Pollard invented the script for use with A-Hmao, one of several Miao languages spoken in southeast Asia. The script underwent a series of revisions until 1936, when a translation of the New Testament was published using it.

The introduction of Christian materials in the script that Pollard invented had a great impact among the Miao people. Part of the reason was that they had a legend about how their ancestors had possessed a script but lost it. According to the legend, the script would be brought back some day. When the script was introduced, many Miao came from far away to see and learn it.

Pollard credited the basic idea of the script to the Cree syllabics designed by James Evans in 1838–1841: “While working out the problem, we remembered the case of the syllabics used by a Methodist missionary among the Indians of North America, and resolved to do as he had done.”  He also gave credit to a Chinese pastor: “Stephen Lee assisted me very ably in this matter, and at last we arrived at a system.” 

Changing politics in China led to the use of several competing scripts, most of which were romanizations. The Pollard script remains popular among Hmong people in China, although Hmong outside China tend to use one of the alternative scripts. A revision of the script was completed in 1988, which remains in use.

As with most other abugidas, the Pollard letters represent consonants, whereas vowels are indicated by diacritics. Uniquely, however, the position of this diacritic is varied to represent tone. For example, in Western Hmong, placing the vowel diacritic above the consonant letter indicates that the syllable has a high tone, whereas placing it at the bottom right indicates a low tone.

Alphabets

The script was originally developed for A-Hmao, and adopted early for Lipo.  There is also a Nasu alphabet using Pollard script.

Consonants

Vowels and finals

Positioning tone marks

Baseline tone marks

Archaic baseline tone marks

Unicode 

The Pollard script was first proposed for inclusion in Unicode by John Jenkins in 1997. 
It took many years to reach a final proposal in 2010.

It was added to the Unicode Standard in January, 2012 with the release of version 6.1.

The Unicode block for Pollard script, called Miao, is U+16F00–U+16F9F:

Published sources 

 Reprinted in

References

External links
 
  Dingle describes how Sam Pollard used positioning of vowel marks relative to consonants to indicate tones.

Writing systems introduced in 1936
Abugida writing systems
West Hmongic languages